Marksville Prehistoric Indian Site, also known as the Marksville site, (16 AV 1) is a Marksville culture archaeological site located  southeast of Marksville in Avoyelles Parish, Louisiana. The site features numerous earthworks built by the prehistoric indigenous peoples of southeastern North America.

Description

Marksville is the type site for the Marksville culture (a local variation of the Hopewell tradition) and was the first scientifically excavated site for the culture. Centuries later the Avoyel and Natchez peoples lived in the vicinity of the site until 1700. The site is also one of the largest of the period in the southeastern United States, with large and distinctive ring features not found elsewhere. The site's importance has been known since the 1920s, when it was first formally investigated, and it is regularly the subject of further investigation. Radiometric dating of the sites features have yielded occupancy dates from 0-400 CE.

Landmark and access
The archaeological site was declared a National Historic Landmark in 1964.

The site was formerly operated by the State of Louisiana as a Louisiana State Park, however, in August 2020, the ownership and operations of the site transferred to the City of Marksville. As of November 2021, the site is closed to public access.

See also
 Crooks mound
 Grand Gulf Mound
 List of Hopewell sites
 List of National Historic Landmarks in Louisiana
 National Register of Historic Places listings in Avoyelles Parish, Louisiana

References

External links

 Marksville State Historic Site - Louisiana Office of State Parks - Official Page
 

Marksville culture
Native American museums in Louisiana
Archaeological museums in Louisiana
Museums in Avoyelles Parish, Louisiana
Mounds in Louisiana
National Historic Landmarks in Louisiana
Louisiana State Historic Sites
Archaeological type sites
Protected areas of Avoyelles Parish, Louisiana
Archaeological sites on the National Register of Historic Places in Louisiana
National Register of Historic Places in Avoyelles Parish, Louisiana